Dirce is a genus of moths in the family Geometridae.

Species
 Dirce aesiodora Turner, 1922
 Dirce lunaris (Meyrick, 1890)
 Dirce oriplancta Turner, 1926
 Dirce solaris (Meyrick, 1890)

References
 Dirce at Markku Savela's Lepidoptera and Some Other Life Forms
 Natural History Museum Lepidoptera genus database

Archiearinae
Geometridae genera